A fog signal station is a station at which a fog signal exists, but at which there is no lighthouse.  A light tower might be appended to the station at a later date, as happened at The Cuckolds Light in Maine.  A number of these stations were constructed along the California coast, although few survive in their original form today.

See also
Fiddler's Reach Fog Signal
Lime Point Light
Manana Island Sound Signal Station

References
 under "Manana Island Fog Signal Station"
 Front matter, page 1.

Navigation